Manners is a lunar impact crater located in the western part of the Mare Tranquillitatis. Its diameter is 15 km. It was named after British astronomer Russell Henry Manners. To the northeast is the larger crater Arago and to the south are Ritter and Sabine. The crater has a rim with a higher albedo than the surrounding mare, making it appear bright. This is a circular, bowl-shaped feature with a raised rim and a relatively flat interior.

Satellite craters

By convention these features are identified and realised on lunar maps by placing the letter on the side of the crater midpoint that is closest to Manners.

References

External links

Manners at The Moon Wiki
 

Impact craters on the Moon